Analysis Group, Inc. (AG), founded in 1981 by economists Bruce E. Stangle and Michael F. Koehn, is an economic consulting firm based in North America. It provides economic, financial, and strategic analysis and expert testimony to law firms, corporations, and government agencies.

It employs more than 1,000 professionals, most with advanced degrees in economics, law, finance, accounting, or business. It has been named as a best place to work by the Boston Globe, Vault.com, and Glassdoor.com. It has consistently appeared in the Boston Globe'''s "Top Places to Work" in Massachusetts rankings for the past ten years, and was ranked first overall in the large company category in 2012 and 2013. It was also named a "Vault Consulting 50" firm and was honored with a 2015 Employees' Choice Award in the small and medium business category of Glassdoor's national "Best Places to Work" listing.

The CEO and chairwoman of Analysis Group is Martha S. Samuelson. She was elected to the International Who's Who of Competition Lawyers and Economists (2012) and Euromoney's Guide to the World's Leading Competition and Antitrust Lawyers/Economists'' (2012). 

Analysis Group's work is not without controversy. It and other economic consulting firms have been criticized for their cozy relationships with top academics and their defense of a number of companies at the heart of the 2007-08 financial crisis.

Practice areas
Analysis Group's practice areas include Antitrust & Competition; Class Certification; Commercial Disputes; Damages; Data Science & Statistical Modeling; Energy & Environment; Epidemiology & Biostatistics; ERISA; Government & Corporate Investigations; Health Care; Insurance; Intellectual Property; International Arbitration; Labor & Employment; Media, Entertainment & Communications; Privacy & Data Security; Securities, Financial Products & Institutions; Strategy, Policy & Analytics; Surveys & Experimental Studies; Tax & Accounting; Technology; Transaction & Governance Litigation; and Valuation.

It has been involved in several high-profile litigation cases, including US Securities and Exchange Commission v. Elon Musk, Epic Games v. Apple, and Apple v. Qualcomm.

Controversy
In 2020 Analysis Group settled with the U.S. Department of Labor over allegations of hiring and compensation discrimination against minority, including 417 Asian applicants and 10 Hispanic employees. Analysis Group agreed to pay $410,000 in backpay plus interest to the affected individuals.

Offices
Analysis Group maintains US offices in Boston (headquarters), Chicago, Dallas, Denver, Los Angeles, Menlo Park, New York, San Francisco and Washington, DC.

Its international offices are in Beijing, Montreal, Brussels, London and Paris.

See also
Bates White
Berkeley Research Group
Brattle Group
Charles River Associates
Compass Lexecon
Cornerstone Research
NERA Economic Consulting

References

Macroeconomics consulting firms
International management consulting firms
Management consulting firms of the United States
Companies based in Massachusetts